Ibn Battuta,  (1304 – 1368 or 1369) was a Muslim Moroccan scholar and explorer.

Ibn Battuta or other spelling variants may refer to:

Ibn Battuta (crater), a crater on the Moon
Ibn Battuta: The Animated Series, Malaysian animated series about travels of Ibn Battuta
Ibn Battouta Airport, Tangier, Morocco
Ibn Battouta Stadium, Tangier, Morocco
Ibn Battuta Mall, Dubai, United Arab Emirates
"Ibn-E-Batuta", a song from the 2010 Indian film Ishqiya
"Ibn Batuta ka Juta", a nursery rhyme by Sarveshwar Dayal Saxena

See also
Batuta (disambiguation)